Marcelo Brozović (born 16 November 1992) is a Croatian professional footballer who plays as a defensive midfielder for  club Inter Milan and the Croatia national team. Ele é frequentemente considerado as one of the world's best midfielders.

Club career

Early career
Brozović was born in Zagreb, and graduated from neighbouring Hrvatski Dragovoljac's youth setup. He made his debut as a professional on 24 July 2010, starting and playing the full 90 minutes in a 1–4 loss against Dinamo Zagreb. Brozović scored his first goal on 18 March of the following year, the winner against Karlovac.

Lokomotiva
In July 2011, he signed with Lokomotiva, after Dragovoljac's relegation. He appeared in 27 league matches in his first campaign, scoring four times as Lokomotiva achieved a comfortable mid-table position.

Dinamo Zagreb
In August 2012, Brozović signed a seven-year contract with Dinamo Zagreb, as a replacement for Hamburger SV-bound Milan Badelj. He was given squad number 77, and made his competitive debut on 14 September in the goalless draw against NK Osijek at home, appearing as a second-half substitute. Four days later, Brozović made his UEFA Champions League debut by playing full-90 minutes in a 0–2 home defeat to Porto in the matchday 1 of group stage.

He had to wait until 14 April of the following year to score his first Dinamo Zagreb goal, as he netted the second of the 2–0 home win over Inter Zaprešić. Brozović finished his first season with the club by making 30 appearances in all competitions, including 23 in league, scoring twice in the process, as Dinamo Zagreb won league, reached second round of the 2012–13 Croatian Football Cup, and was eliminated in the group stage of the Champions League.

Inter Milan
On 24 January 2015, Brozović signed with Inter Milan on a one-and-a-half year-loan deal, with a conditional obligation for Inter to buy. He became the 900th player to wear the Nerazzurri shirt. Brozović took his preferred shirt number 77, last worn at Inter by Sulley Muntari. He made his official debut with the club on 1 February 2015, coming on as a substitute in the 3–1 away upset of Inter against Sassuolo. He scored his first Inter goal in final day in a 4–3 win over Empoli, helping Inter to end the season with a win. Brozović finished his first Inter season with 15 league appearances, 13 of them as a starter and one goal.

Brozović begun his first full-season at Inter by starting in the 2015–16 Serie A opening match against Atalanta at home. He scored his first league goal of the season on 23 November during the match against Frosinone at home, coming off the bench in 88th minute and netting the fourth goal of the match four minutes later, helping Inter to record its biggest win of the season. On 12 December, Brozović scored his second league goal, a screamer, and the last goal of the 4–0 away win against Udinese, celebrating the goal with his teammates with "EpicBrozo" signature in the process.

Three days later, in the 2015–16 Coppa Italia's round of 16 match against Cagliari, Brozović scored the same identical goal he scored against Udinese, helping Inter to progress in the quarter-final with a 3–0 win. On 7 February of the following year, he assisted Jeison Murillo's goal from a corner kick in the match against Hellas Verona, which finished in a 3–3 away draw. Two week later, Brozović supplied his second assist to Mauro Icardi who scored the third goal of the 3–1 home win against Sampdoria.

On 2 March, in the returning leg of Coppa Italia's semi-final against Juventus at San Siro, Brozović scored a brace, including one with penalty kick, to help Inter overturn the 3–0 defeat and equal the aggregate 3–3, which led the match into the penalty shootouts; he scored his penalty shootout attempt, but Inter lost 3–5 and eventually was eliminated from the competition.

Brozović started the new season by playing the last 20 minutes of the 2–0 defeat at Chievo Verona, picking up a yellow card in the 79th minute. On 15 September, during the first match of 2016–17 UEFA Europa League group stage against Hapoel Be'er Sheva, Brozović played as a starter before was substituted in the beginning of the second half; he refused to stay in the bench which created controversies at Inter. This led the coach Frank de Boer to omit him for the league match against Juventus for "unprofessional behaviour". Speaking about the issue, De Boer stated that Brozović “has to demonstrate his discipline”, adding that "he did something I couldn’t accept".

He was finally called back on 20 October for the league match against Cagliari, finished in a 1–2 home defeat, remaining as an unused substitute. Four days later, he made his on-field debut in the matchday 3 of 2016–17 UEFA Europa League group stage against Southampton, but was sent off in the 77th minute after receiving a second yellow card.

Brozović improved his game with the new coach Stefano Pioli, scoring his first goal of the season on 24 November in the 3–2 away defeat to Hapoel Be'er Sheva, despite being 2–0 up in the first half, which confirmed the elimination of Inter from Europa League. That was followed by his first league goal four days later, scoring inside two minutes with a right shoot from edge the box, helping Inter past Fiorentina 4–2 at San Siro. On 7 December, Brozović extended his contract with Inter Milan until 2021, with the new deal including a significant wage rise. Four days later, he scored a double helping Inter to beat Genoa 2–0.

He scored his first goals of the 2017–18 season on 2 October in the 2–1 home at newly promoted side Benevento. Later on 11 February of the following year, during the league match versus Bologna, Brozović was replaced in 58th minute after a poor performance; while making his way out of the field, he was booed by some sections of the crowd, and he responded by sarcastically clapping back. He was fined by the club for the incident, and was left on bench for the following match versus Genoa, entering on the field only in the final minutes. Later on throughout the season, Brozović returned to his best form, cementing his place in the starting and becoming a fan favourite again. He made his 100th Serie A appearance on 12 May in the 1–2 upset loss to Sassuolo. In the final match of the season, against Lazio, his delivery in the first half resulted in a Danilo D'Ambrosio goal, while his cross from a corner kick in the second half was finished by a Matías Vecino header as Inter won 3–2 to secure a place in the UEFA Champions League group stage for the 2018–19 season. Individually, he scored four goals and provided nine assists, eight of them in the second part of the season, in 31 league appearances.

In the 2018–19 season, Brozović made his first UEFA Champions League appearance for Inter on 18 September in the opening Group B match in a 2–1 comeback win versus Tottenham Hotspur. He netted his first goal of the campaign four days later, a 94th-minute winner over Sampdoria in round 5 of Serie A.

On 26 August 2019, he scored Inter's first goal of the season in a 4–0 victory over Lecce. On 21 September he scored the opener in a 2–0 victory over Milan in Derby della Madonnina. On 9 February 2020, Brozović captained Inter in another Derby della Madonnina and scored in the 4–2 victory. On 17 August, in a Europa League semi-final, he provided Danilo D'Ambrosio with an assist for the second goal in a 5–0 victory over Shakhtar Donetsk at Merkur Spiel-Arena. Four days later, he was named in the starting XI for the final against Sevilla, providing Diego Godín with an assist for Inter's second goal. Nevertheless, Sevilla won the trophy after a 3–2 victory over the Nerrazzuri.

On 2 May 2021, four matchdays before the end of the season, Sassuolo drew 1–1 with Atalanta at home, meaning that Inter mathematically secured the Serie A title. It was Inter's first league title since 2009–10 season, ending Juventus' nine-season-long league-winning streak. The title was also Brozović's first trophy with the Nerrazzuri. He finished the season with two goals and seven assists over all competitions.

On 27 August 2021, in a 3–1 league victory over Hellas Verona, Brozović made his 200th Serie A appearance, becoming the first Croatian to achieve that in the three-points-for-a-win era.

International career

Brozović appeared with Croatia in the under-18, under-19, under-20 and under-21 categories. With the latter he appeared well during 2013, scoring seven goals in eight appearances.

On 31 May 2014, Brozović was included in Niko Kovač's final list for 2014 FIFA World Cup, and made his debut for the main squad on 7 June, starting in a 1–0 success against Australia at the Estádio de Pituaçu.
Brozović made his World Cup debut five days later, playing the last 26 minutes in a 1–3 loss against Brazil.

Since the 2014 World Cup, Brozović became a regular starter in Croatia's Euro 2016 qualifiers, playing alongside Luka Modrić and Ivan Rakitić as part of a rotating midfield triangle for Croatia. He scored his first goal for Croatia against Azerbaijan, in a 6–0 win in Osijek. His second goal of the Euro 2016 qualifiers came in March 2015 against Norway, when he gave his team a 1–0 lead with a low curving shot from 20 meters into the bottom right corner.

In May 2016, Brozović was part of Croatia squad for the UEFA Euro 2016. He made his first UEFA European Championship appearance in Croatia's first match of Group D versus Turkey, playing full 90 minutes as the team won 1–0. He later netted a brace for Croatia on 12 November 2016 in a World Cup qualifier against Iceland.

In May 2018 he was named in Croatia's preliminary 32 man squad for the 2018 FIFA World Cup in Russia. He made the final squad, as Croatia progressed all the way to the final versus France. Brozović was a mainstay in the starting lineup, and he went the full 90 as Croatia lost 4–2.

Style of play
Brozović's style of play has been compared to that of Frank Lampard. He is noted for his passing, tackling, runs and stamina. He is usually deployed as a deep-lying playmaker or box-to-box midfielder, but is considered to be a versatile midfielder who can perform well anywhere in midfield.

Personal life
Brozović married Silvija Lihtar in 2016; their daughter, Aurora, was born one year later. In October 2019 they had their second child, a son called Rafael.

In summer 2018, Brozović donated sets of textbooks to all primary school students for the forthcoming school year in Cerić, Croatia. In June 2020, he paid for a hip surgery for a Macedonian woman whom he had never met before.

Career statistics

Club

International

Scores and results list Croatia's goal tally first, score column indicates score after each Brozović goal.

Honours
Dinamo Zagreb
Prva HNL: 2012–13, 2013–14
Croatian Supercup: 2013

Inter Milan
Serie A: 2020–21
Coppa Italia: 2021–22
Supercoppa Italiana: 2021, 2022
UEFA Europa League runner-up: 2019–20

Croatia
FIFA World Cup runner-up: 2018; third place: 2022

Individual
UEFA Europa League Squad of the Season: 2019–20
Serie A Best Midfielder: 2021–22
Serie A Player of the Month: April 2022
Serie A Team of the Year: 2021–22

Orders
Order of Duke Branimir: 2018

References

External links

Inter Milan official profile

1992 births
Living people
Footballers from Zagreb
Croatian footballers
Association football midfielders
NK Hrvatski Dragovoljac players
NK Lokomotiva Zagreb players
GNK Dinamo Zagreb players
Inter Milan players
Croatian Football League players
Serie A players
Croatia youth international footballers
Croatia under-21 international footballers
Croatia international footballers
2014 FIFA World Cup players
UEFA Euro 2016 players
2018 FIFA World Cup players
UEFA Euro 2020 players
2022 FIFA World Cup players
Croatian expatriate footballers
Expatriate footballers in Italy
Croatian expatriate sportspeople in Italy